Himmel may refer to:

People
Erwin Leo Himmel (born 1956), Austrian automobile designer
Friedrich Heinrich Himmel (1765–1814), German composer
Gerhard Himmel (born 1965), German wrestler
Joseph J. Himmel (1855–1924), American Jesuit missionary
Paul Himmel (1914–2009), American fashion and documentary photographer

Other uses
 Himmel, Missouri, a ghost town in the United States
 Himmel Park, urban park in central Tucson, Arizona

See also

 Himmel und Erde, traditional German dish
 Himmel, Amor und Zwirn, 1960 West German comedy film
 In re Himmel, a Supreme Court of Illinois case